Iopydol is a pharmaceutical drug used as a radiocontrast agent in X-ray imaging.

See also 
 Iodinated contrast

References 

Iodoarenes
Vicinal diols
4-Pyridones
Radiocontrast agents